Risaldar-Major Mir Dad Khan, OBI (died ), was from the Tareen tribe in Hazara region of the North West Frontier Province (now Khyber Pakthunkhwa in Pakistan). He was a Risaldar Major in the British Indian Army. He was the father of former Pakistani president Ayub Khan and the Muslim League stalwart Sardar Bahadur Khan

Background 
Mir Dad Khan was born into a prominent family of the ethnic Pashtun Tareen/Tarin clan, settled in village Rehana in the Haripur District of the Hazara region. After some basic schooling, he decided to enroll as a soldier in the (then) British Indian Army, at quite a young age.

He enlisted as a sowar (mounted trooper) in a cavalry regiment, the 9th Hodson's Horse, in 1887 and after initial training, was posted to duties at Ambala, Punjab. His first participation in a major military campaign was during the Chitral Expedition circa 1895–97. Subsequently, he served in the Tirah Campaign and operations in the Barra Valley, 1897–98. Later, between October 1914 and mid-1915, he served along with his regiment in France in World War I.

He was invalidated due to health reasons in 1915 and returned to India to the regimental depot until the end of the War. He retired in August 1918 and was awarded an Order of British India (2nd class) for long service. During his military service, he represented his regiment at the Delhi Durbars of 1903 and 1911.

He died c. 1926 in Rehana.

Legacy 
One of Mir Dad Khan's sons from his second wife, Muhammad Ayub Khan, rose to be a general in the Pakistan Army and the country's first military dictator and later president. One of his grandsons is Gohar Ayub Khan, Shaukat Ayub Khan, Akhtar Ayub Khan and Tahir Ayub; and his great-grandsons include Yousuf Ayub Khan, Akbar Ayub Khan, Omar Ayub Khan and Arshad Ayub Khan.

References 

Year of birth missing
1926 deaths
People from Haripur District
Pashtun people
British Indian Army officers
Indian Army personnel of World War I
Mir Dad